Jambur is a village in Girsomnath district of Gujarat, India. Jambur is known for being home for centuries to some members of the African-origin Siddi tribe.

See also 
 Talala, Gujarat
 Africa–India relations

References 

Villages in Junagadh district